National Lottery Authority is a statutory agency of the Ghana and it is under the Ministry of Finance. As a governmental organization, the NLA is responsible for organizing raffles for the nation, for a chance to win outstanding prices thereby making lives more appreciating, fun, and better for each and everyone including rich and poor. The board of the NLA oversees the activities of the organization, headed by the chairperson, one representative of the Ministry of Interior, one representative of the Ministry of Finance, another representative of the Attorney General's Department, two Government appointees, and the Director General.

History 
At the establishment of the national body to oversee lottery affairs, the Kwame Nkrumah administration created the Department of National Lotteries and established it under the Lotteries Act (1958). The department was incorporated into the Lotteries and Betting Act of 1960.

Affiliations
The NLA is a member of the International Association of State Lotteries and the African Association of State Lotteries.

Operations
The Authority is headquartered in Accra.

References

Ministries and Agencies of State of Ghana
Lotteries